The Democratic Party of Kosovo (abbr. PDK) is one of the largest political parties in Kosovo. It was originally a social-democratic party coming out of the demilitarised Kosovo Liberation Army after the Kosovo War, with most of the leadership coming from Albanian nationalists and former members of the People's Movement of Kosovo. However, during its congress in January 2013, it positioned itself as a centre-right party and is considered to be a conservative party.
The Democratic Party of Kosovo since July 2021 is headed by Memli Krasniqi, the former Vice –President of the Assembly of Kosovo, Minister of Agriculture and Minister of Culture, Youth and Sports.

History 
The party was founded on 14 May 1999 from the political wing of the Kosovo Liberation Army as the Party for the Democratic Progress of Kosovo (Partia për Progres Demokratik e Kosovës), but was renamed on 21 May 2000. The party has increased in size and regional scope, initially winning the elections of 2007 and winning most of the regional elections in the municipal elections of 2009. PDK renewed its governing mandate after winning the elections of 2010. Members of the Party for the Democratic Progress of Kosovo were blacklisted by the US under then-President George W. Bush in 2001.

In the 2004 legislative elections, the party won 28.9% of the popular vote and 30 out of 120 seats in the Assembly of Kosovo; in 2007 PDK won a majority for the first time with 35% of the vote. In 2010's disputed elections, PDK won again with 32% of the vote.

After 14 years of leadership of Hashim Thaçi who had to resign from party leadership to take the position of the President of the country, in May 2016, Parliament Speaker Kadri Veseli became party president by acclamation. He was elected with no votes against and no abstentions.

Elections in 2010 
Parliamentary elections were held on 12 December 2010, the first such elections organized in Kosovo since their declaration of independence. After early results, Hashim Thaçi, who was on course to gain 32 per cent of the vote, claimed victory for PDK, the Democratic Party of Kosovo. He said he intended to continue governing for another 4 years. After accusations of vote-rigging, voting was repeated in several municipalities. With more than 30 per cent of the vote, Thaçi formed a coalition with the New Kosovo Alliance (AKR), led by the ex-president, Behgjet Pacolli. It was in fourth place with 8 percent of the popular vote.

The turnout at the election was significantly higher than usual, augmented by Serbs who decided to vote in the disputed republic. Following the confirmation of the final election results, PDK and AKR formed a government with a program dedicated to EU integrations. The new government included many of the younger generation of PDK members, such as Bedri Hamza, Memli Krasniqi, Vlora Çitaku, Blerand Stavileci, Petrit Selimi, etc.

Controversies 

MPs Rrustem Mustafa and Latif Gashi resigned their offices in 2015 after receiving confirmed sentenced for war crimes. In April 2016, PDK MP Azem Syla was sought for arrest in connection to a large criminal group which appropriated socially owned property located in Prishtina’s suburbs amounting 30 million EUR.

Seven out of ten current mayors belonging to the PDK are suspected, have been charged or convicted of abuse of office and other criminal activity. Sami Lushtaku of Skenderaj has been sentenced to 12 years for war crimes while he is being investigated for a corruption case. He ran for mayoral reelections and is serving in office both from prison. Nexhat Demaku of Drenas has been sentenced to one year and is being investigated in another case. Salim Jenuzi of Dragash was charged but found not guilty. Bajram Mulaku of Vushtrria and Begzad Sinani of Kamenica were investigated but not charged. Sinani is again under investigation for alleged illegal hunting. Former Lipjan mayor Shukri Buja was sentenced to four months suspended imprisonment for not declaring property to the Anti-Corruption agency, while Vitia Mayor Nexhmedin Arifi to 18 months suspended imprisonment for misuse of official position. Xhabir Zharku of Kaçanik was convicted to three years in prison for threats related to a privatisation case and illegal possession of a firearm forcing him to resign his position but was allowed to escape to Sweden where he now lives. Ramadan Muja of Prizren was convicted by a court of first instance. The case has been returned to retrial meanwhile Muja has run for and won a second term as mayor. Former Ferizaj Mayor Bajrush Xhemajli started serving a two-year sentence in 2014 after being convicted for killing a person in a traffic accident in 2009. The prosecution also investigated the former mayor of Gjilan Qemal Mustafa for road tenders but did not file charges. Sokol Bashota of Klina was being investigated for abuse of office in 2016.

In 2000 the brother of PDK leader Hashim Thaçi Gani Thaçi was found during a raid in Prishtina with a million German marks (500,000 euros) in cash. The origin of the money was uncertain.

Former Interior Minister Bajram Rexhepi was in office when about 1.5 million euros were embezzled is a case related to the production of passports by an Austrian company. Later about 200,000 of them were discovered in a chauffeur of Kadri Veseli. Adem Grabovci, leader of PDK parliamentary group, was involved in the "Pronto" scandal, a leak of audio recordings of an EULEX investigation, in which Adem Grabovci, Hashim Thaçi and Vlora Çitaku discuss employment of an uncle of Grabovci, Curr Gjoci. Shortly afterwards, Gjoci was appointed Director of the University Clinical Centre in Prishtina. In another scandal Grabovci's sons beat several police officers. They were sentenced to a prison sentence of six months which converted to 3,000 EUR fine each.

Leader of PDK, 1999–present

Election results

References

Political parties in Kosovo
National conservative parties
Social conservative parties
1999 establishments in Kosovo
Political parties established in 1999